Sky Shuttle Helicopters Limited (Portuguese:   Helicópteros Aéreos Expressos) is a helicopter service operator based in Macau. Formerly known as Helicopters Hong Kong Limited and before that as East Asia Helicopters, it operates helicopter routes between Macau, Hong Kong and Shenzhen. Sky Shuttle employs over 250 people.

History
East Asia Airlines Limited was established in July 1988 and Macau-Hong Kong services commenced in November 1990 by using two Bell 222 helicopters with six flights per day. Helicopters Hong Kong Limited (‘HeliHK’) established in 1997, formed a partnership with East Asia Airlines, to create the largest commercial helicopter operation in the Pearl River Delta region providing shuttle service between Hong Kong and Macau and introduced a fleet change from Bell 222 to Sikorsky S76C+ helicopters. Subsequently, a new company name “Sky Shuttle Helicopters Limited” was launched in November 2008, as part of a new corporate branding exercise. In 2009 another fleet change took place when AgustaWestland AW139 helicopters were purchased to replace the aging S-76C+s.

2010 ditching
The airline's noon departure from Hong Kong for Macau ended in a controlled ditching of one of its AW139s in Victoria Harbour immediately post-takeoff due to a tail rotor failure.  The 11 passengers and 2 crew escaped serious injury.

Services

Shuttle service

Sky Shuttle is the sole commercial helicopter operator between HK, Macau and Shenzhen, PRC, with
Sky Shuttle operating 40 flights daily between Macau Maritime Terminal and Hong Kong-Macau Ferry Terminal in Hong Kong from 10 am to 11 pm, and 6 flights a day between Macau Maritime Terminal and Shenzhen Baoan International Airport, all of about 15 minutes duration.

Charter services

Sky Shuttle also operates services for sightseeing, aerial photography and general private charter.

Heliports
 Sky Shuttle Heliport renamed from Shun Tak Heliport 2nd Helipad added 2009
 Shun Tak Heliport, at the Hong Kong Macau Ferry Terminal, Shun Tak Centre, 200 Connaught Road Central, Hong Kong - 1 pad built in 1986,
 Macau Heliport at 3/F Macau Maritime Terminal, Avenida da Amizade, Macau - 5 pads upgraded in 2001
 Shenzhen Heliport at 3/F of Shenzhen Baoan International Airport Terminal, Shenzhen, China

Fleet
As of July 2016, Sky Shuttle operates AgustaWestland AW139 helicopters.

Formerly operated
 Bell 222
 Sikorsky S-76

Also previously operated by Helicopters Hong Kong were

 Aérospatiale SA 315B Lama
 Eurocopter AS350
 Bell 206

See also
 List of companies of Macau

References

External links

 Sky Shuttle official site
Sky Shuttle Helicopter aircraft

Airlines of Macau
Airlines established in 1997
Airlines of Hong Kong
Airlines of China
Helicopter airlines